Rocca di Mezzo (locally La Rocca) is a comune and town in the Province of L'Aquila, in the Abruzzo region of central Italy.

It is home to the seat of the Sirente-Velino Regional Park.

References 

Cities and towns in Abruzzo